Superargo Versus Diabolicus is a 1966 superhero film written and directed by Nick Nostro. It had the sequel in 1968,  Superargo and the Faceless Giants directed by Paolo Bianchini.

Plot
A superhero battles a madman who is plotting to steal uranium as part of a plan to take over the world.

Cast 
 Giovanni Cianfriglia as  Superargo
 Gérard Tichy as Diabolicus (as Gerhard Tichy)
 Loredana Nusciak as Diabolicus' Mistress
 Mónica Randall as Lidia
 Francisco Castillo Escalona as Col. Alex Kinski
 Emilio Messina as  Diabolicus' Henchman 
 Geoffrey Copleston as Conrad

Production
Director Nick Nostro commented on actor Giovanni Cianfriglia as Superargo in the film, stating that he had him act like Zorro. Nostro claimed he got him the best voice actor he could find and then felt "despite his shortcomings, he made a good impression on screen." Nostro stated that the film was shot with exteriors in Barcelona and interiors shot in Rome a De Paolis studios. Nostro added that due to the cheap budget, his producer had them shoot some indoor scenes at his villa in Frascati.

Release
Superargo Versus Diabolicus opened in Rome in December 1966. It was released in Spain in 1967 as Superargo contra Diabolicus.

It was followed by a sequel Superargo and the Faceless Giants (1968).

See also
 List of Italian films of 1966
 List of Spanish films of 1966

References

Footnotes

Sources

External links

Italian science fiction films
1960s science fiction films
Spanish superhero films
Films directed by Nick Nostro
Italian superhero films
1966 films
Films shot in Rome
Films shot in Barcelona
Film superheroes
1960s superhero films
Films scored by Franco Pisano
1960s Italian films
1960s Spanish films